Anarpia is a genus of moths of the family Crambidae.

Species
Anarpia incertalis (Duponchel, 1832)
Anarpia iranella (Zerny, 1939)

References

Scopariinae
Crambidae genera